Galepsus or Galepsos was a Greek city located in the region of Edonis in ancient Thrace and later in Macedon. It was located east of Phagres and about 17 km from Amphipolis. It belonged to the Delian League and it was founded as a colony of Thasos. After the conquest of Amphipolis it was occupied by Brasidas in 424 BCE, but recovered by Cleon in the ensuing year. Perseus of Macedon, fleeing the Romans who had defeated him at Pydna, sailed the mouth of the Strymon, and towards Galepsus, staying there before moving on to Samothrace.

It was named after Galepsos who was a descendant of Thasos and of Telephe.

The site of Galepsus is near the modern Kariani.

See also
 Galepsus (Chalcidice)

References

Populated places in ancient Macedonia
Populated places in ancient Thrace
Former populated places in Greece
Greek colonies in Thrace
Thasian colonies
Members of the Delian League